The Francs-tireurs et partisans – main-d'œuvre immigrée (FTP-MOI) were a sub-group of the Francs-tireurs et partisans (FTP) organization, a component of the French Resistance. A wing composed mostly of foreigners, the MOI maintained an armed force to oppose the German occupation of France during World War II. The Main-d'œuvre immigrée was the "Immigrant Movement" of the FTP.

The last surviving member of the FTP-MOI's Manouchian Group, resistance fighter Arsène Tchakarian, died in August 2018.

History
The FTP-MOI groups were organized in the Paris region in 1941, at the same time as the Francs-tireurs et partisans. Their ranks were filled with foreign communists living in France who were not part of the French Communist Party. Although integrated with the FTP, these groups depended directly on Jacques Duclos, who passed on orders from the Communist International (Comintern). The national manager of the MOI was Adam Rayski, who recommended members for the FTP-MOI.

Members also included other immigrants, especially many young Hungarian writers, artists and intellectuals. Among them were the painter Sándor Józsa; sculptor István Hajdú (Étienne Hajdu); journalists László Kőrösi and Imre Gyomra; photographers Andras (André) Steiner, Lucien Hervé, and Ervin Marton; and printer Ladislas Mandel.

The FTP-MOI were among the most active and determined of the resistance groups; particularly because they were foreigners and mostly Jews, they were under the direct watch of the Vichy regime and the Germans. Without maintaining strict secrecy, they risked internment, deportation and death. Because they depended directly on the Comintern, with Duclos as their intermediary, they were often on the front line when the order to fight came from Moscow.  The various French groups were more attentive to the French national political climate.

The Parisian groups were initially led by Boris Holban, then the poet turned activist Missak Manouchian. After Manouchian was arrested in 1943 and executed in February 1944, Holban took over again.

The FTP-MOI are particularly well known because of the highly publicized trial of numerous members of the Manouchian Group.  Tracked, arrested and interrogated by the French police, the show trial of the 23 members was held in front of a German military tribunal at the Hôtel Continental. It began on 17 February 1944, lasted between two and four days, and after a 30-minute deliberation, the court reached the following verdict: All of the accused were condemned to death, with no possibility of appeal.

All but two were shot immediately on 21 February at Mont-Valérien.  The execution of Olga Bancic was suspended for further enquiry and because French law prohibited executing women by firing squad. In a new sentence passed on her birthday of 10 May 1944 at Stuttgart, she was condemned to death. She was beheaded shortly after the sentencing.  One accused, Migratulski, was transferred to French jurisdiction.

Following the trial and executions, the Germans created a poster with a red background, featuring ten men of the Manouchian group with their names, photos and alleged crimes; it became known as l'Affiche Rouge.  The Germans distributed thousands of copies of the poster around the city to encourage Parisians to think of the partisans as criminal foreigners and "not French", and discourage resistance; instead, the Affiches Rouges inspired citizens to more actions. Some marked the posters with phrases such as Morts pour la France! (They died for France.)

Structure of the FTP-MOI

Paris region, Groupe Manouchian
The group in Paris was commanded by Boris Holban from April 1942 to July 1943. From July 1943 to November 1943, the group was led by Joseph Epstein and Missak Manouchian. Holban commanded the group again from December 1943 to August 1944. The armed group had the following members:

 Celestino Alfonso — Spaniard
 Olga Bancic — Jewish Romanian
 Joseph Boczov — Jewish Hungarian
 Georges Cloarec — French Breton
 Rino Della Negra— French Italian
 Thomas Elek — Jewish Hungarian
 Maurice Fingercwajg — Polish Jew
 Spartaco Fontano — Italian
 Imre Glasz — Jewish Hungarian
 Jonas Geduldig — Polish Jew
 Elise Gerchinovitz - French Jew
 Léon Goldberg — Polish Jew
 Szlama Grzywacz — Polish Jew
 Stanislas Kubacki — Polish
 Arpen Tavitian — Armenian
 Cesare Luccarini — Italian
 Missak Manouchian — Armenian
 Marcel Rayman — Polish Jew
 Roger Rouxel — French
 Antonio Salvadori — Italian
 Willy Schapiro — Polish Jew
 Arsène Tchakarian — Armenian. Tchakarian, the last surviving member of the Manouchian Group, died on August 4, 2018, at the age of 101.
 Amadeo Usseglio— Italian
 Wolf Wajsbrot — Polish Jew
 Robert Witchitz — French

Lyon region, Compagnie Carmagnole-Liberté  

The armed group Carmagnole in Lyon and the armed group Liberté in Grenoble had the following members:

 Herbert Herz
 Léon Centner
 Jacques Viktorovitch
 Léon Landini
 Simon Fryd
 Elie Amselem
 Max Tzwangue
 Léon Rabinovitch
 Léopold Rabinovitch
 Paul Mossovic
 Francis Chapochnik

Herbert Herz was a member of both groups.

Toulouse region, 35th Brigade 
The 35th Brigade took its name from the thirty-five divisions of gunners of the International Brigades, to which Marcel (Mendel) Langer, head of the regional FTP-MOI, had claimed to belong. In February 1943, Langer was arrested carrying explosives.  He was tried by the section spéciale of the Toulouse appeals court. The avocat général, Lespinasse, demanded his execution and, on 21 March 1943, Langer was sentenced to death. He was executed on 23 July 1943.

The 35th Brigade then called themselves the Brigade Marcel Langer in his honor.  Eighteen members were arrested by the Vichy police and handed over to the Germans. Two died of unknown causes on the train transporting them to be deported. Four were shot.

In popular culture
The Spanish writer Jorge Semprún wrote a postwar novel referring to the FTP-MOI in Paris.  He had also served in the Resistance, first with the FTP-MOI, and then with the FTP after he joined the Communist Party.  He was captured and deported, but survived internment at Buchenwald.
There have been numerous portrayals of the Resistance in novels.

Filmography
Stéphane Courtois and Mosco Boucault, Des terroristes à la retraite, broadcast by Antenne 2 in 1983, included interviews of surviving FTP-MOI members and families of the victims. It accused the Communist Party in France (PCF) of betraying the Manouchian Group.
 Mosco Boucault (director), Ni travail, ni famille, ni patrie - Journal d’une brigade FTP-MOÏ (1993), documentary about the Toulouse 35th Brigade
 Étrangers et nos frères pourtant (Foreigners and yet our brothers) - 2x26mn (1994), First part: Liberté, guérilla urbaine à Lyon et Grenoble Francs-Tireurs et Partisans de la Main-d’œuvre Immigrée (FTP-MOI), Second part: Carmagnole : l’insurrection de Villeurbanne.  About actions of the FTP-MOI in Lyon and Grenoble. A video documentary by Claude and Denis Collins Cugnot, the title was taken from the poem/song "L'affiche rouge" (Words: Louis Aragon . Music: Jean Ferrat, Maurice Vandair).
La traque de l’Affiche rouge, a documentary produced by Denis Peschanski and Jorge Amat, broadcast by France 2 on 15 March 2007, refuted Courtois and Boucault's allegations.
The dramatic film L'Armée du crime (2009) features the story of the Manouchian Group. Directed by Robert Guédiguian, a Marseille-based filmmaker of German and Armenian parentage, it was adapted from a story by Serge Le Péron. It reflects some of the divisions among the Résistance.

Bibliography 
 Claude COLLIN, Carmagnole et Liberté. Les étrangers dans la Résistance en Rhône-Alpes, PUG, 2000
 Claude LEVY(*), Raymond LEVY(*), Une histoire vraie, Paris : Les éditeurs français réunis, 1953
 Claude LEVY(*), Les parias de la résistance, Paris : Calmann-Lévy, 1970
 Jean-Yves BOURSIER, La guerre de partisans dans le Sud-Ouest de la France, 1942–1944. La 35e Brigade FTP-MOI, Paris : L’Harmattan, 1992
 Gérard de VERBIZIER, Ni travail, ni famille, ni patrie. Journal d’une brigade F.T.P.-M.O.I., Toulouse, 1942–1944, Paris : Calmann-Lévy, 1994
 Marc BRAFMAN(*), « Les origines, les motivations, l’action et les destins des combattants juifs (parmi d’autres immigrés) de la 35e Brigade FTP-MOI de Marcel Langer, Toulouse 1942-1944 », in : Le Monde juif, n° 152, pp. 79–95, 09-12/1994
 Damira TITONEL-ASPERTI(*), Carmela MALTONE, Ecrire pour les autres. Mémoires d’une résistante. Les antifascistes italiens en Lot-et-Garonne sous l’occupation, Presses universitaires de Bordeaux, 1999
 Jean-Loup GASSEND, Autopsy of a Battle, the Allied Liberation of the French Riviera, Schiffer, 2014
 Greg LAMAZERES, Marcel Langer, une vie de combats. 1903-1943. Juif, communiste, résistant... et guillotiné, Toulouse : Privat, 2003
 Henri SOUM, Chronique des bords de Garonne, t. 3 « Le Vent des Fous », Ed. Signes du monde, 1994
 Marc Levy, Les enfants de la liberté, Paris: Editions Robert Laffont, 2007.
 F.F.I. - F.T.P.F., Pages de gloire des vingt-trois, Paris: Immigration, 1951.
 Philippe Robrieux, L'Affaire Manouchian - Vie et mort d'un héros communiste, Paris: Fayard, 1986.

(*) Former member of the 35 Brigade FTP-MOI "Marcel Langer"

See also
 Affiche rouge
 Österreichische Freiheitsfront (An Austrian communist resistance network in Belgium)

References

Further reading

External links 
 Léon Landini, member of the Carmagnole-Liberté group (French vidéo)
 "Evidence of Léon Landini, president of the Amicale Carmagnole-Liberté", Patriote Résistant, 2002, FNDIRP
 "Herbert Herz", Carmagnole-Liberté group (French), Herbert Herz Website]
 "Affiche Rouge" (French)
 

 
French Resistance networks and movements
Affiche Rouge
1941 establishments in France
1944 disestablishments in France